Amo (stylised in lowercase) is the sixth studio album by British rock band Bring Me the Horizon. Originally scheduled for release on 11 January 2019, it was released on 25 January 2019. The album was announced on 22 August 2018, a day after the release of the lead single "Mantra". It was produced by vocalist Oliver Sykes and keyboardist Jordan Fish, and was written and recorded primarily in Los Angeles.

The album was preceded by five singles. The lead single, "Mantra", was released on 21 August 2018. The second single, "Wonderful Life" featuring Dani Filth of Cradle of Filth, was released on 21 October 2018. The third single, "Medicine", was released on 3 January 2019. The fourth single, "Mother Tongue", was released on 22 January 2019. The fifth single, "Nihilist Blues" featuring Grimes, was released on 24 January 2019. "Sugar Honey Ice & Tea" was released as the album's sixth single on 26 July 2019.
"In the Dark" was released as the album's seventh single on 21 October 2019.

The band embarked on the First Love World Tour in 2019 in support of the album. In the 22 August 2018 issue of Kerrang!, they described the album as "varied", "free", "weird" and "mental", with NME noting that "Mantra" continues the electronic and pop rock elements featured on the band's previous studio album, That's the Spirit (2015). "Mantra" subsequently debuted at number one on the UK Rock & Metal Chart, and its video was released on 24 August. Upon its release, the album was met with critical acclaim and was later nominated for a Kerrang! Award for Best Album as well as the Grammy Award for Best Rock Album.

Background and promotion
The album, named after the Portuguese word for "I love", was first promoted by an advertising campaign of billboards across London and other cities worldwide with symbols used by the band in the past on them, along with the words "Do you wanna start a cult with me?", which are lyrics from "Mantra". A website titled joinmantra.org was also launched that stated "Salvation will return", and a phone number that when called featured various audio clips at different times, including one of a woman named Samantha stating "They're making me do this. I didn't know what I was getting myself into."

The song "Mantra" was subsequently premiered on BBC Radio 1, with Sykes saying to Annie Mac: "It's basically—we've gone off and recorded some stuff and this is the first thing we've wanted to show people of our return. It's quite different but it's got similarities—it's what we wanted to share with the world." Sykes stated that "Mantra" is "not really" representative of the sound of the whole album, also saying "every song on the record is completely different. It’s a lot more experimental than our last record."

On 21 October, the band released their second single "Wonderful Life" featuring Dani Filth, along with the tracklist for Amo. That same day, the band announced that the album release date has been delayed to 25 January 2019.

On 3 January 2019, the band released the third single "Medicine" and its corresponding music video. On 22 January, the band released their fourth single "Mother Tongue". On 24 January, the band released their fifth single "Nihilist Blues" featuring Grimes. On 26 July, the band released the sixth single "Sugar Honey Ice & Tea" alongside an accompanying music video. On 21 October, the band released the seventh single "In the Dark" alongside an accompanying music video featuring Forest Whitaker.

Composition

Influences, style and themes
Sykes stated about the album: "amo is a love album that explores every aspect of that most powerful emotion. [...] It deals with the good the bad and the ugly, and as a result we've created an album that's more experimental, more varied, weird, and wonderful than anything we've done before." He later commented that Amo is a concept album about love, as "Everything boils down to love in the end". Sykes also said that some of the lyrical content concerns his divorce. The genres of the album has been described as pop rock, electronic rock, electropop, synth-pop, EDM, alternative rock, electronica, hard rock, pop metal, and pop. The album also contains elements of hip hop, and trap.

Reception

Critical reception

Amo received critical acclaim from music critics. At Metacritic, which assigns a normalised rating out of 100 to reviews from mainstream critics, the album has an average score of 85 out of 100 based on 12 reviews, indicating "universal acclaim". AllMusic gave the album a positive review saying, "Amo is a genre-bending thrill ride that marks a brave new era for the band." The Independent called the album "catchy and eclectic" but also said that "amo won't satisfy all of BMTH's fans...[but will] bring in some new ones." NME praised the album calling the interludes "dark and mechanical" and "exciting signposts to the future". In a positive review, Substream Magazine saying, "The way that Bring Me The Horizon weaves through genres and dives into them further is challenging."

Wall of Sound rated the album 7.5/10 and said: "Remember how frontman Oli Sykes trolled fans into thinking the band were going to be included on Justin Bieber's 2016 Purpose Tour through the UK? Well, it's kind of like he/they have taken that joke seriously and gone down the path to see what happens, but realistically, they've been progressing towards something like this since the Sempiternal album cycle finished." Dave Simpson at The Guardian compared it to Linkin Park's A Thousand Suns, stating "the likes of 'Medicine', 'Mother Tongue' and 'In the Dark' are anodyne pop that is liable to alienate the band's fanbase and makes an uneasy fit with their desire to experiment. Other tracks lose their way in processed vocals and unfamiliar styles". Lukas Wojcicki of Exclaim! scored the album 7/10 stating: "conversely, the songs that dive head first into electronics, fully embracing this new territory, are some of the album's best and most memorable."

In a positive review, Consequence of Sound wrote, "In U2 terms, That's the Spirit was BMTH's Achtung Baby, where they introduced a new sound, and amo is their Zooropa, where they've taken that sonic evolution one step further." Kerrang! praised the album saying, "Amos ability to be so many things to so many people is what truly impresses throughout." Metal Injection gave the album a positive review, saying, "if you're open to electronic music and pop as well as rock and metal, you'll most likely enjoy amo."

Accolades

Track listing

Notes
 All track titles are stylised in lowercase except for "Mantra", which is stylised in all caps.
 Track 6 is mislabeled as "Ounch" on vinyl releases.

Personnel
Credits retrieved from AllMusic.

Bring Me the Horizon
 Oliver Sykes – lead vocals, production
 Lee Malia – guitars
 Jordan Fish – keyboards, programming, percussion, backing vocals, production, engineering
 Matt Kean – bass
 Matt Nicholls – drums

Additional musicians
 Grimes – guest vocals on track 3
 Dani Filth – guest vocals on track 5
 Rahzel – guest vocals and beatboxing on track 12
 Choir Noir – additional vocals
 Parallax Orchestra – orchestra

Additional personnel
 Romesh Dodangoda – engineering
 Dan Lancaster – mixing
 Ted Jensen – mastering
 Alejandro Baima, Francesco Cameli, Nick Mills and Daniel Morris – engineering assistance
 Rhys May – mixing engineering
 Matt Ash and Craig Jennings – art
 Darren Oorloff – design
 Pretty Puke – photography

Charts

Weekly charts

Year-end charts

Certifications

Notes

References

External links

Amo at YouTube (streamed copy where licensed)

2019 albums
Bring Me the Horizon albums
Pop rock albums by English artists
Electronic rock albums by English artists
Electropop albums
Alternative rock albums by English artists
Hard rock albums by English artists